Buffaloville is an unincorporated community in Clay Township, Spencer County, in the U.S. state of Indiana.

History
Buffaloville was formerly called Buffalo. The town was laid out in 1860 as Buffalo. A post office was established in 1860 as Buffalo, the post office was renamed that same year to Buffaloville, and the post office was discontinued in 1982.

Geography

References

Unincorporated communities in Spencer County, Indiana
Unincorporated communities in Indiana